The Special Warfare Memorial Statue — known informally as Bronze Bruce — was the first memorial in the United States to soldiers who had served in the Vietnam War. It was created in 1968 by sculptor Donald De Lue (1897-1988) and dedicated on November 19, 1969. The statue is the centerpiece of the U.S. Army Special Operations Command's Memorial Plaza at Fort Bragg, North Carolina, which honors all Army special operations soldiers. The statue depicts a Special Forces soldier as most all of the Army special operations soldiers killed in Vietnam were SF.

Symbolism 
According to the United States Army Special Operations Command website:

The base of the statue contains a time capsule with an SF uniform, green beret, a bust of John F. Kennedy, and a copy of Kennedy's speech when presenting the green beret to the Special Forces.

Cost
The statue's cost of $100,000 was funded entirely by donations. John Wayne, co-director and star of the 1968 film, The Green Berets, and Barry Sadler, former SF soldier and composer of the Ballad of the Green Berets, both donated $5,000 for the statue. Robert McNamara, who was Secretary of Defense at the time, donated $1,000. The remaining donations came from Special Forces soldiers from all over the world.

References

External links

Monuments and memorials in North Carolina
1968 sculptures
Buildings and structures in Fayetteville, North Carolina
Outdoor sculptures in North Carolina
Bronze sculptures in North Carolina
Statues in North Carolina
Sculptures of men in North Carolina
Vietnam War monuments and memorials in the United States